Renne Gail Jarrett (born January 28, 1946) is an American actress. She appeared in TV dramas beginning as a child. Notable TV roles included the title role in the short-lived NBC comedy Nancy.  Jarret has made more than 100 commercials, and has also performed on Broadway.

Early years 
Born in Manhattan, Jarrett is the daughter of Barbara and Robert E. Jarrett. Her father managed mutual funds, and her mother managed Jarrett's career. She and her two younger sisters, were child actors and models. She is a graduate of the Nightingale-Bamford School, and she attended Northwestern University. She was a debutante in 1963 and was a member of the Junior League.

Career
By age eight, Jarrett had appeared more than 25 times on dramatic television programs, including Studio One and was a regular on the daytime drama Portia Faces Life. She created the role of Eileen McCallion on Love of Life and acted on The Edge of Night and The Secret Storm. She had the title role as the daughter of a U.S. president in the NBC situation comedy Nancy (1970-1971). She also made more than 100 commercials for products that included Colgate 100, Reynolds Wrap, and Scotch Tape.

On Broadway, Jarrett portrayed Rita Flannigan in The Loud Red Patrick (1956) and a maid in Giants, Sons of Giants (1962).

Personal life 
On September 11, 1971, Jarrett married actor John (Jack) Rothery Stauffer in Manhattan. They have one child together, Drew Stauffer. She has been married to Bruce Bilson since May 4, 1981.

Filmography

Film

Television

References 
 

1946 births
20th-century American actresses
American child actresses
American soap opera actresses
American stage actresses
American television actresses
Actresses from New York City
Living people
Nightingale-Bamford School alumni
21st-century American women